Sultan-un-Nissa Begum (25 April 1586 – 5 September 1646) was a Mughal princess, the eldest child and first daughter of Mughal Emperor Jahangir from his first wife, Shah Begum.

Life 
Sultan-un-Nissa, also known as Nithar Begum, was born on 25 April 1586, Kashmir during the reign of her grandfather, Akbar on the intended return journey of the Imperial household towards Fatehpur Sikri. Her father was the eldest surviving son of Akbar, Prince Salim and her mother was Shah Begum, popularly known as Man Bai, the daughter of Bhagwant Das, the Raja of Amer.

On the occasion of her birth, the Emperor assembled a great feast at the house of the Queen Mother, Mariam Makani where large amount of gifts were exchanged.

Her only full sibling was the ill-fated Khusrau Mirza who was killed on the orders of her younger half-brother, Prince Khurram.

Death 
Sultan-un-Nissa died unmarried on 5 September 1646. She was buried in the mausoleum of her grandfather, Akbar.

Ancestry

References

1586 births
1646 deaths
Mughal princesses
Daughters of emperors